McLaren is a 2017 New Zealand sports documentary film based on the life of Bruce McLaren, founder of the Bruce McLaren Motor Racing team.  The film stars Dwayne Cameron as Bruce McLaren and was directed by Roger Donaldson.

Synopsis
The film recounts the life of New Zealand motor car racer Bruce McLaren through interviews, archival footage, and recreations.

Cast
 Dwayne Cameron as Bruce McLaren
 Matt Coldrick as English Doctor
 Mario Andretti as himself
 Alastair Caldwell as himself
 Emerson Fittipaldi as himself

Production
Scenes were shot at 590 Remuera Rd, Remuera, Auckland 1050, New Zealand, where Bruce McLaren grew up.

Release
The film premiered in the UK on 25 May 2017, followed by its release in New Zealand on 1 June 2017. The film screened at the 2017 Sydney Film Festival before being released in Australian on 21 June 2017.

Reception

 Ellie Walker-Arnott of Time Out gave it 4 out of 5 starts, writing, "A handful of dramatisations – intended to flesh out gaps in the narrative – jar while at times the film digs deep into detail in a way that threatens to alienate all but the most dedicated racing fans. But ultimately the human story of this scrappy and magnetic man keeps the doc on track."
 Steve Newall of the New Zealand Herald gave it 3 out of 5 stars, writing that the film "should hold differing types of appeal to various generations. For older viewers it'll be the retelling of a familiar story of one of their fallen heroes, whereas others may gravitate to the mid-20th-century motorsport environment".
 Peter Bradshaw of The Guardian gave it 2 out of 5 stars, calling it a "motor-racing film only for petrolheads" that "does not tell us why we should be interested in its subject" because it "makes no serious attempt at reaching out beyond its fanbase, connecting with non-petrolheads, or gaining any perspective on the sometimes scary and dysfunctional world of motor racing".
 John Nugent of Empire gave it 2 stars, writing that the film is "assembled in such a way that can only appeal to the target Top Gear demographic. Non-petrolheads need not apply."
 Zara Horn gave it 5 stars for telling the story of a motorsports legend who overcame his childhood physical challenges to pursue his passion and establish an enduring legacy.

References

External links
 

2017 films
Documentary films about auto racing
Universal Pictures films
2017 documentary films
Films directed by Roger Donaldson
Films set in New Zealand
Films shot in New Zealand
New Zealand auto racing films
New Zealand documentary films
2010s English-language films